Tagetes elongata is a Latin American species of marigolds in the family Asteraceae. It has been found in central and southern Mexico from San Luis Potosí and Zacatecas south to Chiapas.

Tagetes elongata is an annual herb up to 60 cm (2 feet) tall. Leaves are pinnately compound with 9-17 toothed leaflets. The plant produces numerous flower heads in flat-topped arrays, yellow, each head containing ray florets surrounding disc florets.

References

External links

elongata
Endemic flora of Mexico
Plants described in 1803
Taxa named by Carl Ludwig Willdenow